The Kenya African National Union (KANU) is a Kenyan political party that ruled for nearly 40 years after Kenya's independence from British colonial rule in 1963 until its electoral loss in 2002. It was known as Kenya African Union (KAU) from 1944 but due to pressure from the colonial government, KAU changed its name to Kenya African Study Union (KASU) mainly because all political parties were banned in 1939 following the start of the Second World War. In 1946 KASU rebranded itself into KAU following the resignation of Harry Thuku as president due to internal differences between the moderates who wanted peaceful negotiations and the militants who wanted to use force, the latter forming the Aanake a forty (The forty Group), which later became the Mau Mau. His post was then occupied by James Gichuru, who stepped down for Jomo Kenyatta in 1947 as president of KAU. The KAU was banned by the colonial government from 1952 to 1960. It was re-established by James Gichuru in 1960 and renamed KANU on 14 May 1960 after a merger with Tom Mboya's Kenya Independence Movement.

History
From October 1952 to December 1959, Kenya was under a state of emergency arising from the armed Mau Mau rebellion against British colonial rule. KAU, the national political movement for Africans was banned in 1952 and its leaders including Jomo Kenyatta imprisoned in 1953. The Colonial Government set out to implant tribalism in its most virulent form into the body politic of Kenya. During this period however, African participation in the political process increased rapidly throughout the colony of Kenya. The colonial government banned national political movements in 1952. Starting in 1954 the colonial government started to actively promote regional tribal based political parties led by leaders friendly to the colonial government. The colonial government governor then appointed these leaders of the tribal parties to the LegCo in 1956. Ronald Ngala was appointed to represent the Coast region, Daniel Moi was appointed to represent Rift Valley, Masinde Muliro was appointed to represent Western while Argwings Kodhek was appointed to represent Nairobi while Oginga Odinga became the Nyanza LegCo member. Jeremiah James Nyaga was appointed to represent Central Kenya. Total political party ban however remained in force in central Kenya from 1952 until 1960.

The first direct elections for Africans to the Legislative Council took place in 1957. The majority of the 'moderate' and friendly leaders appointed to the LegCo by the colonial government were re-elected back to the LegCo in 1957. The only exception was Tom Mboya, who ran as an independent and defeated Argwings Kodhek who had been appointed by the colonial government to represent Nairobi in 1956.

Origins and Kenyatta
The Kenya African Union was a political organization formed in 1944 to articulate Kenyan grievances against the British colonial administration. The KAU attempted to be more inclusive than the Kikuyu Central Association by recruiting membership across the colony of Kenya.

Kenya African Union was led by Jomo Kenyatta from 1947, until his incarceration for alleged involvement in Mau Mau in 1953, at which point the KAU was banned by the colonial government. The colonial government also banned national political parties and any political party in central Kenya. The ban for national political movements was lifted in 1960 and Kenyatta was released in 1961.

On 14 May 1960 KAU having been resurrected by James Gichuru merged with Tom Mboya's  Kenya Independence Movement and the Nairobi People's Convention Party to form the Kenya African National Union (KANU) with Tom Mboya as its first secretary general and James Gichuru as KANU chairman. Oginga Odinga was the KANU first vice chairman.

From October 1952 to December 1960, Kenya was under a state of emergency arising from the armed Mau Mau rebellion against British colonial rule. Kikuyu, Embu and Meru political involvement was restricted heavily in this period in response to the insurrection (a restriction only lifted when the emergency ended in 1960 and national political parties were allowed).

The Kenya African Democratic Union (KADU) was founded in 1960, to challenge KANU. KADU's aim was to defend the interests of the tribes so-called KAMATUSA (an acronym for Kalenjin, Maasai, Turkana and Samburu) as well as the European settler community, against the dominance of the larger Luo and Kĩkũyũ tribes that comprised the majority of KANU's membership (Kenyatta himself being a Kikuyu). KANU was in favour of immediate total independence, new independence constitution and universal suffrage while KADU was supporting the continuation of the colonial political system established by the Lyttelton Constitution of 1954 with federalism (Majimbo) and white minority rule as KADU's key tenets. Despite the numerical advantage lying with the numerically stronger KANU, a form of Federalism involving Kenya's 8 provinces was adopted in Kenya's independence as a result of British colonial government supporting KADU's plan. After independence KANU nonetheless decided to remove all provisions of a federal nature from the constitution.

Independence
Kenya became independent on December 12, 1963, and the next year became a republic within the Commonwealth. Jomo Kenyatta, head of the Kenya African National Union, became Kenya's first president.
KADU dissolved itself voluntarily in 1964 and joined KANU after a strong lobbying by Tom Mboya.
A small but significant leftist opposition party, the Kenya People's Union (KPU), was formed in 1966, led by Jaramogi Oginga Odinga, a former vice president and Luo elder. The KPU was banned and its leader detained after political unrest related to Kenyatta's visit to Nyanza Province that resulted in the Kisumu massacre. No new opposition parties were formed after 1969, and KANU became the sole political party. At Kenyatta's death in August 1978, Vice President Daniel arap Moi, a former KADU member became interim President. On October 14, Moi became president formally after he was elected head of KANU and designated its sole nominee.

One-party state and return to democracy
In June 1982, the National Assembly amended the constitution, making Kenya officially a one-party state. Parliamentary elections were held in September 1983. The 1988 elections reinforced the one-party system. However, in December 1991, parliament repealed the one-party section of the constitution. By early 1992, several new parties had formed, and multiparty elections were held in December 1992.

President Moi was reelected for another 5-year term. Opposition parties won about 45% of the parliamentary seats, but President Moi's KANU Party obtained the majority of seats. Parliamentary reforms in November 1997 enlarged the democratic space in Kenya, including the expansion of political parties from 11 to 26. President Moi won re-election as president in the December 1997 elections, and his KANU Party narrowly retained its parliamentary majority, with 109 out of 212 seats.

2002 elections
At the 2002 legislative national elections, the party won an overall 29.0% of the popular vote and 64 out of 212 elected seats. In the presidential elections of the same day, the party's candidate Uhuru Kenyatta won 31.3% of the vote, and was thereby defeated by Mwai Kibaki from the National Rainbow Coalition (NARC) party with 62.2%. On December 29, 2002, the Kenyan electoral commission confirmed that the former opposition NARC party had achieved a landslide victory over the ruling KANU party, thus bringing to an end 40 years of single party rule and 24 years of rule by Daniel arap Moi.

Post-2002
The political parties ODM-Kenya and Orange Democratic Movement both came into existence out of this movement. The smaller faction, headed by Nicholas Biwott and supported by Daniel arap Moi was opposed to the direction Kenyatta was taking the party. The two factions briefly patched up their differences under the mediation of former party leader Daniel Moi; the result being KANU did not field a presidential candidate in Kenya's disputed general election of 2007, backing instead the incumbent Mwai Kibaki.

Uhuru Kenyatta and Moi in 2007
In September 2007, Kenyatta announced that he would not run for the presidency and would support Kibaki's re-election, sinking any hopes that KANU would back the Orange Democratic Movement. William Ruto however remained in ODM applying for the presidential candidacy. Of particular interest is that Uhuru's statement came soon after Moi's declaration that he would back current president Kibaki's re-election bid.
KANU is part of the Party of National Unity (PNU), a coalition party behind Kibaki. However, unlike other PNU member parties, only KANU had clearance to field its own parliamentary and civic candidates. Since the coming into force of the Political Parties act of 2011, differences have once again emerged over the future of the party with a faction led by Gideon Moi accusing Uhuru Kenyatta of neglecting the party. Kenyatta, and his supporters, eventually quit the party altogether and in December 2012, KANU entered a four party coalition, including the National Vision Party, United Democratic Movement and New Ford Kenya, to field a single presidential candidate at the 2013 general elections.

Ideology
Upon its inception in 1960, KANU included politicians of various ideologies, including African socialism, which was highlighted in the immediate post-independence period. However, with the adoption of Sessional Paper No. 10 of 1965 in Kenya's parliament and the resignation of left-leaning politicians allied to Oginga Odinga, it pursued a mixed market economic policy, with state intervention in the form of parastatals. It steered Kenya to side with the West during the Cold War, with both Jomo Kenyatta and Daniel Moi using apparent links to the Soviet Union as pretexts to crush political dissent.

Structure
KANU's leadership structure consists of a national chairman, a secretary general, and several national vice chairmen. All these officials are elected at a national delegates conference. (The last full election was in 2005 and it saw Uhuru Kenyatta, who has since quit the party, confirmed as party chairman.)

Delegates who participate at the national elections are selected through the party's constituency level branches.

Past holders of the Chairman position
 1960 to 1962 – James Gichuru (acting for Kenyatta)
 1961 to 1978 – Jomo Kenyatta
 1978 to 2005 – Daniel arap Moi
 2005 to 2012 – Uhuru Kenyatta
 2013 to present – Gideon Moi

Electoral history

Presidential elections

National Assembly elections

Senate elections

References

External links 
 BBC report of KANU defeat

 
Political parties in Kenya
Parties of one-party systems
Anti-communist parties
Political parties established in 1960
1960 establishments in Kenya